, also known as Vento Aureo, is the fifth story arc of the Japanese manga series JoJo's Bizarre Adventure, written and illustrated by Hirohiko Araki. It was serialized in Shueisha's Weekly Shōnen Jump for a little under 4 years, from December 11, 1995, to April 5, 1999. Within Golden Wind, the JoJo's Bizarre Adventure title is rendered in Italian, as Le Bizzarre Avventure di GioGio.

Taking place in Naples, Italy the year 2001, the story follows Giorno Giovanna, the illegitimate son of the long deceased Dio Brando who aspires to climb the ranks of becoming a mafia boss in hopes of benefiting his hometown, whilst battling other stand-users using his own stand Gold Experience and being pursued by Jotaro Kujo, who has long since killed Dio in the past. 

As it is the fifth part of the series, the 155 chapters pick up where the fourth left off and are numbered 440 to 594, with the tankōbon volumes numbered 47 to 63. It was preceded by Diamond Is Unbreakable and followed by Stone Ocean. An anime adaptation by David Production, JoJo's Bizarre Adventure: Golden Wind, aired on TV from October 2018 to July 2019. A hardcover edition release of the manga in English by Viz Media began publication in August 2021.

Plot
In 2001, Koichi Hirose arrives in Naples, Italy at Jotaro Kujo's request to obtain a skin sample from a young man named Haruno Shiobana whom Jotaro suspects to be the son of Dio Brando, conceived with Jonathan Joestar's body prior to the events of Stardust Crusaders. Koichi ends up being scammed by Haruno, now going by the name of Giorno Giovanna, whose Stand Gold Experience allows him to transform inanimate objects into living organisms. After defeating a Stand-wielding mafioso named Bruno Bucciarati who was sent to avenge the injury he inflicted on a gang member, Giorno wins him over by revealing his goal of becoming a mafia boss to better Naples and end the scourge of drug trafficking plaguing the city's youth. Bucciarati agrees to introduce Giorno into the Passione organization, allowing Giorno to take a deadly initiation test from the morbidly obese capo Polpo. After convincing Koichi to cease his investigation, Giorno passes the test, though he indirectly kills Polpo afterward as revenge for an innocent bystander's death. 

Giorno is placed in Bucciarati's group, which consists of fellow Stand users Guido Mista, Leone Abbacchio, Narancia Ghirga and Pannacotta Fugo. Polpo's apparent suicide provides an opening for Bucciarati to achieve the rank of capo by donating Polpo's amassed fortune on the island of Capri to a gang representative. Bucciarati is then given Polpo's final mission: Passione's boss, a mysterious figure whose identity is unknown to even his subordinates, requests that his teenage daughter Trish Una be brought safely to him in Venice. Along the way, Bucciarati's team eliminates all but one of the members of Passione's traitorous Hitman Team, who seek to use Trish as a means to identify and defeat the boss. On the boss's orders, the group retrieves a key in Pompeii and use it to unlock the room inside the Stand-using turtle Coco Jumbo.

After reaching Venice safely and escorting Trish into the Church of San Giorgio Maggiore, Bucciarati realizes that the boss intends to kill his own daughter to maintain his anonymity. An enraged Bucciarati pursues the boss in order to save Trish, but suffers grievous injuries at the hands of the boss's invincible Stand King Crimson, which has the ability to see into and skip time's progression several seconds into the future. Giorno seemingly heals Bucciarati's injuries as he escapes with Trish, and the two manage to escape the church, unaware that the body Bucciarati's soul resides in has already died. Despite Fugo's objections, the rest of the group defects from Passione and pledges to uncover the boss's identity in order to defeat him. The group and Trish, who discovers her own Stand Spice Girl, are forced to fight for their lives against elite assassins sent by the boss.

Bucciarati's group travels to the island of Sardinia after Trish recalls it as the boss's birthplace so Abbacchio can use his Stand to identify the boss. Vinegar Doppio, an alter ego of the boss who acts as his liaison to the assassins, reaches Sardina at the same time as the Hitman Team's leader, killing him before getting close enough for the boss to quickly kill Abbacchio. Abbacchio creates a likeness of the boss in his final moments before the group are then contacted by a third party, who reveals the boss's name to be Diavolo and requests that the group visit the Colosseum in Rome to receive a special Arrow. The group arrives in Rome, but is held up when they meet a pair of Stand users called Cioccolatta and Secco, assigned to bump off Bucciarati's group. The group manages to overpower the enemy Stand users, but Diavolo reaches the informant first. He confronts the informant, who is revealed to be Jean Pierre Polnareff. Diavolo fatally wounds Polnareff, forcing him to stab his Stand Silver Chariot with the Arrow and evolve it into Chariot Requiem. Requiem, gifted the ability to swap the souls of living beings, goes berserk and causes a city-wide soul swap, leaving Polnareff's soul in Coco Jumbo's body.

Polnareff explains the Arrow and his Stand to the group, who realize that their own Stands will attack them upon approaching the Arrow. Though the group cripples Bucciarati's body as it awakens, Narancia is killed in skipped time, revealing a dying Doppio to be a separate soul of Diavolo's. Giorno attempts to revive Narancia, but can only reclaim his own body that was originally swapped. Diavolo's own soul is revealed to be inside Mista's body alongside Trish's soul and succeeds in weakening Requiem, but Bucciarati sacrifices himself to dispel the soul swap and pass the Arrow to Giorno. Using the Arrow, Giorno evolves his Stand into Gold Experience Requiem, whose ability prevents Diavolo from being able to attack Giorno and condemns Diavolo to an endless loop of being killed in various ways.

The story jumps back to an incident before Bucciarati's encounter with Giorno. Visited by a florist requesting vengeance for his daughter's death, Bucciarati, Fugo, and Mista visit the alleged murderer's place of residence. It is revealed that the suspect, Scolippi, is a Stand user whose Stand tries to euthanize those who are fated to die, such as the florist's daughter. Scolippi's Stand predicts Bucciarati's death and attempts to reach him, but Mista breaks the Stand before it can do so. As the group leaves the building, the dust of the broken Stand forms the shapes of Bucciarati's, Narancia's, and Abbacchio's faces, revealing their changed fates to an optimistic Scolippi.

As Trish and Mista return to the Colosseum, unaware of Bucciarati's death, Giorno and Polnareff's ghost (now within Coco Jumbo's Stand) agree to preserve the Arrow. Sometime afterward, Giorno becomes the new boss of Passione as Mista and Polnareff observe gang members kneeling before him.

Characters

 Giorno Giovanna, named Haruno Shiobana at birth, is the human son of Dio Brando. As Dio was in possession of Jonathan Joestar's body at the time Giorno was conceived, Giorno inherits the conviction and righteousness of the Joestar bloodline. Giorno aspires to overthrow Passione's boss, put an end to the practice of selling drugs to children, and restructure the organization into one that helps the people of Italy. Giorno uses the Stand Gold Experience, which has the ability to imbue things with life, allowing him to create either complete organisms or human body parts. After piercing itself with Polnareff's Arrow, Giorno's Stand evolves into Gold Experience Requiem, a Stand that can revert any action, willpower, or state of being back to "zero," effectively nullifying them.
 Bruno Bucciarati is the leader of a group within Passione, and is later promoted to caporegime within the gang. He uses the Stand Sticky Fingers, which can place a zipper on any object, allowing entrance into it. Bucciarati can also use Sticky Fingers to separate objects into smaller objects which can be zipped back together. Following an encounter with Diavolo, Bucciarati spends the remainder of the story as a 'walking corpse,' rendering him nearly immune to damage but gradually depriving him of his senses and life energy. He also appears in the 2012 spin-off Jolyne, Fly High with Gucci.
 Leone Abbacchio is a former police officer, and a member of Bucciarati's gang. He uses the Stand Moody Blues, which can replay events as a 3D video recording. Abbacchio also appears in Jolyne, Fly High with Gucci.
 Guido Mista is a member of Bucciarati's gang. He uses a revolver in tandem with his Stand, Sex Pistols, which is composed of six small humanoids who can control the bullets Mista shoots. The humanoids are numbered No.1 through No.7, with no No.4 as a result of Mista's crippling tetraphobia. Each of the pistols which make up Mista's stand have their own individual personalities and internal conflicts, which Mista is often forced to resolve.
 Narancia Ghirga is a member of Bucciarati's gang. He is rather air-headed and somewhat childish, but remains loyal to Bucciarati. He uses the airplane-like Stand, Aerosmith, which is equipped with machine guns, bombs and a carbon dioxide radar, allowing him to track down any opponent that breathes.
 Pannacotta Fugo is a member of Bucciarati's gang. Fugo tends to be erratic in mood, often breaking into short bursts of rage. Fugo uses the Stand Purple Haze, which emits a virus that rapidly devours organic matter. Purple Haze is indiscriminate in how its virus affects people, affecting both friends and enemies alike. Fugo is the central character of the novels Golden Heart, Golden Ring and Purple Haze Feedback, which take place after he defects from Bucciarati's group.
 Trish Una is the daughter of Passione's boss. Following her mother's death, Bucciarati's group is entrusted with the job of protecting her from rival factions within the gang. Eventually, she awakens the Stand Spice Girl, which can increase objects' elasticity to make them nearly indestructible.
 Coco Jumbo is a turtle that gained a Stand. Bucciarati's group is gifted Coco Jumbo by the boss to aid their mission. The turtle's Stand, Mr. President, manifests as a miniature hotel room inside of its shell that can be entered and exited freely, allowing its possessors to hide inside and transport themselves within the turtle.
 Jean Pierre Polnareff is a French swordsman who traveled alongside Jotaro Kujo and Joseph Joestar to defeat Dio in 1988. Polnareff later discovered Diavolo's true identity, only to be severely injured and left for dead by Passione's boss. After Bucciarati's team betrays the boss, Polnareff contacts the group and offers them a way to defeat the boss: a unique Stand Arrow that allows its user to control souls themselves. Polnareff wields the extremely fast sword-wielding Stand, Silver Chariot. When Diavolo confronts him, Polnareff is forced to use the Stand Arrow on Silver Chariot and evolve it into Chariot Requiem, which has the ability to swap the souls of living beings and gradually transform them into something else entirely.
 Passione is the most powerful gang in Italy, controlled by a boss shrouded in secrecy. Passione controls all levels of crime in Italy, from low-level thugs and protective services to extremely powerful hitmen and drug traffickers. The gang's incredible level of power over Italy can be attributed to the unusual number of Stand users found within its members.
Diavolo is the boss of Passione, and the father of Trish. He is extremely protective of his identity, intending to kill anyone who threatens his power or his secret, including his own daughter. Diavolo uses the incredibly powerful Stand, King Crimson, which allows him to "erase" a period of time up to ten seconds. While time is "erased," everyone except Diavolo unconsciously carries out their fated actions without regard to his, allowing him to confuse enemies, escape attacks, and land decisive blows. Diavolo is also able to see exactly ten seconds into the future via King Crimson's secondary ability, Epitaph, allowing him to predict and "erase" unfortunate outcomes.
Vinegar Doppio is the Boss' younger, more innocent and eccentric underboss. Although he thinks of himself as Diavolo's most trusted subordinate, the two are actually separate souls inhabiting the same body. Diavolo uses Doppio to move around and take action without revealing his identity. Though Doppio does not seem to possess a Stand of his own, he is allowed to wield King Crimson's arms and Epitaph in battle.
Polpo is an obese caporegime within Passione who resides in prison for his own protection. After Bucciarati advocates for Giorno, Polpo interviews the youth and tasks him with keeping a lighter lit for twenty-four hours to prove his dedication. Polpo's Stand is Black Sabbath, an auto-tracking Stand that can move within shadows for the sole purpose of piercing those who fail Polpo's test with a Stand Arrow stored in its mouth.
The Hitman Team / Execution Squad (La Squadra Esecuzioni) is a squad of Stand users within Passione specializing in assassinations. While they previously served under the leadership of Diavolo, their inquiry into Diavolo's identity led to their former boss having two of their members killed. In retaliation, the group swore vengeance against Diavolo and began pursuing his daughter, Trish, in order to discover his identity and kill him. The group serves as the primary group of antagonists in the first half of the story, though its leader remains unseen until the later half.
Risotto Nero is the leader of the Hitman Team. After his cousin was killed by a drunk driver, Risotto tracked down and assassinated the driver. Risotto then joined Passione to protect himself from the police. Although Risotto works in the background during the first half of the story, he eventually attacks Vinegar Doppio after the rest of his teammates are killed. Risotto can control the iron in his surroundings (including iron in the blood of nearby organisms) with his Stand, Metallica.
Formaggio is the first member of the Hitman Team that the protagonists encounter. Suspecting that Trish has been entrusted to Polpo's successor, the assassin decides to pursue Narancia in order to find Trish's whereabouts. Formaggio can shrink any object or creature with his Stand, Little Feet.
Illuso ambushes Giorno, Abbacchio, and Fugo in the ruins of Pompeii, eventually learning of and hoping to seize the group's objective. Illuso's Stand, Man in the Mirror, can transport anyone and anything into and out of a mirror world, separating enemies from their Stands in the process.
Prosciutto  pursues Bucciarati's team aboard a train to Florence alongside his partner Pesci. Though he can be irritable at times, Prosciutto is supportive of his partner and unwavering in his determination to finish his mission. Prosciutto's Stand, The Grateful Dead, emits a gas that ages anyone nearby, with the speed of their aging depending on their body temperature.
Pesci  attacks Bucciarati's team alongside Prosciutto, who he thinks of as an older brother. Although he acts timid and cowardly at first, Prosciutto's resolve inspires Pesci to become a similarly powerful opponent. Pesci wields the Stand Beach Boy, which takes the form of a fishing rod that can pass through anything to hook his targets.
Melone attacks the group as they attempt to reach Venice after Prosciutto's defeat. He is a perverted individual who is easily excited by fortunate events or suitable "mothers." Melone uses the Stand Baby Face, which impregnates a "mother" with a target's DNA and gives birth to a homunculus that automatically pursues and attacks its target. The auto-tracking Stand's personality and abilities are based on the DNA of its "mother"; as a result, Melone can only control it via communication, and his orders may be overruled at any time.
Ghiaccio pursues Giorno and Mista to Venice, where the three fight to obtain a disc revealing the boss's location. Ghiaccio is an extremely unstable man who is enraged by useless actions and linguistic inconsistencies. He wields the Stand White Album, which produces cryogenic temperatures that freeze anything he touches. White Album allows Ghiaccio to freeze living beings solid, skate across both land and water, and even freeze the air around him by employing its secondary ability, Gently Weeps. 
Sorbet and Gelato are two members of the Hitman Team who are brutally executed by the boss as punishment for looking into his identity. Their deaths spark the Hitman Team's hatred for Diavolo and their desperation to hunt down Trish.
Elite Guard Squad (L'Unità Speciale) is an elite team of Stand users within Passione who act as Diavolo's bodyguards, seeking to capture Bucciarati's group dead or alive for their betrayal of the boss.
Squalo attacks alongside his partner Tizzano as Bucciarati's group attempts to escape Venice. He wields the shark-like Stand Clash, which can travel within and warp to any nearby body of liquid.
Tizzano serves as the methodical foil to his partner Squalo, who he shares a deep bond with. Tizzano can force others to tell lies with his Stand, Talking Head.
Carne wields the Stand Notorious B.I.G, which chases after and devours the fastest-moving thing in its vicinity, powered only by its user's grudge. After its user's untimely death, Notorious B.I.G lives on as an invincible postmortem Stand.
Cioccolata is a sadistic doctor who attacks Bucciarati's group in Rome alongside his pet Secco. Believing that curiosity is what pushes humans to grow, he takes great pleasure in recording and replaying his victims' suffering. Cioccolata wields the Stand Green Day, which produces a mold that rapidly rots anyone in its range if they descend in altitude.
Secco attacks Bucciarati's group alongside Cioccolata. Though he acts as Cioccolata's pet, Secco reveals his true egocentric nature after his master's death. Secco's Stand, Oasis, allows him to liquefy and swim through solid matter as though it were mud. Anything within the solid matter, including living beings, will be liquefied as well.
 Koichi Hirose is a high school student who arrives in Italy to gain a sample of Giorno Giovanna's DNA, as Jotaro Kujo suspects that the youth is related to Dio. Though Koichi antagonizes Giorno after the latter steals his money and luggage, he ultimately recognizes the youth's righteous nature and decides not to interfere with his dream. Koichi wields the Stand Echoes, and can utilize any of the three "ACTs" it developed two years prior. He primarily utilizes Echoes ACT3, which has the ability to immobilize objects or people by greatly increasing their weight.
Scolippi is a sculptor suspected of murdering his girlfriend, the daughter of a vindictive florist. He is a humble and meek person who holds an absolute belief in fate's inevitability, which he attributes to Michelangelo. Scolippi's Stand, Rolling Stones, takes the shape of a nearby person fated to die and follows them; if the target touches the stone, they will be forced to accept an immediate and painless death. Despite being its user, Scolippi has no control over his own Stand, which acts on its own and draws energy from fate.

Production
Hirohiko Araki described the themes of Golden Wind as "human relationships," "friends versus enemies," and "the beauty of betrayal." By depicting the mafia, the author said the story deals with the sadness of having no choice in life or only one place where one belongs——the "dark underbelly of society." Araki also stated that the main focus was to draw "beautiful men" who can only exist in a world where there is "beauty in meeting one's doom." He wanted the characters, sculptures and fashion to be in the style of the Italian city of Rome. The curls in Giorno Giovanna's hair were inspired by Michelangelo's statue David. Araki cited Guido Mista and Prosciutto as characters he enjoyed drawing; the former due to his positive attitude and for being "true to himself without doubts" and the latter for his "brotherly relationship" with his subordinate Pesci and fun Stand power.

Chapters
In the original volumization, chapters 437–439 are a part of Diamond Is Unbreakable.

Original volumes

2005 release

English release

Related media

Anime

The anime adaptation of Golden Wind was announced by series creator Hirohiko Araki at the "Ripples of Adventure" art exhibition on June 21, 2018, and premiered the first episode at Anime Expo on July 5, 2018. The anime adaptation by David Production aired from October 5, 2018, to July 28, 2019, as part of their JoJo's Bizarre Adventure anime television series. Golden Wind was directed by returning series director Naokatsu Tsuda who was accompanied by the senior writer Yasuko Kobayashi. The character designer for Golden Wind was Takahiro Kishida, and the animation director was Shun'ichi Ishimoto. Yugo Kanno returned as composer from previous seasons. The series ran for 39 episodes.

Novels
The novel Le Bizzarre Avventure di GioGio II: Golden Heart/Golden Ring was written by Gichi Ōtsuka and Miya Shōtarō, and released on May 28, 2001. An Italian translation was released in 2004. A second novel, Purple Haze Feedback, was written by Kouhei Kadono and released on September 16, 2011.

Video game

The PlayStation 2 video game GioGio's Bizarre Adventure was released in Japan in 2002, adapting the arc.

Reception
In a 2018 survey of 17,000 JoJo's Bizarre Adventure fans, Golden Wind was chosen as the favorite story arc with 19.1% of the vote.

Both Screen Rant's Steven Blackburn and Jordan Richards of AIPT Comics called Golden Wind a breath of fresh air for JoJo's Bizarre Adventure by deviating from the basic formula and following Giorno, son of villain Dio Brando, as he looks to cement a reputation and build a criminal empire. Jenni Lada of Siliconera also praised the protagonist Giorno and said the first volume of Golden Wind shows how skilled Araki is at getting people quickly invested in a character and story. She wrote, by giving readers a look at Giorno's past and insights into the person he is now, it emphasizes why he is compelling; "We're introduced to his dream and see him take his first steps toward it." Richards wrote that Part 5's vivid and imaginative Stand fights continue JoJo's Bizarre Adventures "wholly unique" style of art not seen in any other series. However, despite calling the supporting cast a memorable bunch, Richards felt they were underdeveloped as of the first volume, but noted they had potential.

Notes

References

Adventure anime and manga
Comics set in Italy
Dissociative identity disorder in popular culture
Fantasy anime and manga
Fiction set in 2001
JoJo's Bizarre Adventure
Organized crime in anime and manga
Shōnen manga
Shueisha manga
Supernatural anime and manga
Viz Media manga
Works about gangsters
Works about organized crime in Italy